The Egyptian Pharmaceutical Students' Federation (EPSF) (Arabic|الاتحاد المصري لطلاب الصيدلة) is an independent student organization representing about 85,000 pharmacy students in 37 pharmacy schools all over Egypt. It works under the supervision of the Egyptian Pharmacist Syndicate, the national FIP member. Since 1982 EPSF has also been a Full Member organization representing Egypt in the International Pharmaceutical Students' Federation.

History
EPSF was initially established in January 1982 with six pharmacy schools:
 Alexandria University
 Assiut University
 Al-Azhar University
 Cairo University
 Tanta University
 Zagazig University
EPSF become a Full Member in IPSF in August 1982, in Sweden during the 28th IPSF congress.

Members

Today EPSF is represented by pharmacy associations in 37 different pharmacy schools in Egypt:

Structure
EPSF consists of the General assembly and the executive board. Each association is represented in the General assembly and has the right to vote according to provisions of the EPSF constitution, which gives the right of voting to the Full members only.

General Assembly (GA) 
The GA is the highest decision-making body in EPSF at which discussion on all the Federation's ongoing matters and plans take place. in addition to reports adoption, admission of new members, and executive board elections.

EPSF General Assemblies are held four times a year, first during the Annual National Congress in October, the second after the mid-year vacation at the end of February, the third during the National Symposium at the end of April, and the fourth in August(final GA ). This ensures a smooth running of the Local Associations whilst taking important decisions, accepting reports of Executives and Associations, admission of new members to EPSF, and the constitutional amendments. The Full Members of EPSF have the right to vote in the General Assembly. full members of EPSF are the associations that fulfill all the conditions to become a full member, they present their reports, attend the General Assembly meetings and pay their membership fees.

Executive Board 

The EPSF Executive board consists of 15 elected members: President, Secretary-General, Treasurer,  Contact Person, Marketing Director, training director, Chairpersons of Public Health, internal Relations, external relations, Professional Development, Media and Publications, Logistics and organizing Continuous Education and the Student Exchange Officer, the Immediate Past President works as an advisor for the Executive board. Executive Board members are Pharmacy students who serve the Federation as volunteers.

Current Executive Board 2021-22 
President : Ms. Alaa Mohammed El-Sayed
Secretary-General: Mr. Ali Eldessoki
Treasurer: Ms. Alyaa Mohsen 
Chairperson of Internal  Relations: Ms. Nada Mohamed Ismail
Chairperson of External  Relations: Mr.  Muhannad Al Harthy
Chairperson of Pharmacy Education:  Mr. Mohamed Abdel-Hafeez
Chairperson of Public Health: Mr. Mohamed Shaaban
Chairperson of Media and Publications: Mr. Mahmoud Raafat 
Chairperson of Logistics and Organizing: Mr. Hamdy Fathy
Contact Person: Mr. Mostafa Kamel
Student Exchange Officer: Ms. Duaa El-Sayed
Marketing Director :Ms. Samar Mohamed
Training Director : Ms. Israa Ahmed
Immediate Past President: Mr. Omar Abdelfattah

Awards

On 6 December 2014 at Mall of Arabia in cairo: EPSF hit Guinness World Record under title of “Most Blood Glucose Tests taken in 24 Hours”; with 8,600 blood glucose tests and they introduced awareness about Diabetes for more than 10,000 persons at a National diabetes awareness campaign “La Vista”

On 12 August 2011, the EPSF was declared winner of the IPSF Annual Award (Sidney J. Relph Award) for the overall best-performing association in the world 2010–11 in the Gala Night of the 57th IPSF World Congress in Hat Yai, Thailand.

Winning First Place in the IPSF Patient Counseling Competition twice. 
Winning Second Place in the IPSF Compounding Competition 
Winning First Place in the IPSF Member Association Poster Competition
Winning First Place in the IPSF’S Tuberculosis Poster Competition
EPSF acquired the 8th place worldwide in diabetes awareness in 2012-2013 according to the International Diabetes Federation (IDF)
EPSF honoring In league of Arab states During world blood donation day 2016.

International Achievements

1-The Egyptian Pharmaceutical Students' Federation hosted the International Pharmaceutical Students' Federation annual world congress three times : 
The 30th IPSF Congress held in Alexandria in August 1984 was the first IPSF Congress to be hosted in Egypt .
The 47th IPSF World Congress held in Cairo in August 2001 .
The 58th IPSF World Congress 2012 held Hurghada the most recent world congress hosted by the Egyptian Pharmaceutical Students' Federation and was attended by over 500 pharmacy students from over 50 countries around the world .

2-The 5th IPSF EMPS Symposium held in Cairo in July 2016 .

3-Participation in Organizing of first annual conference of “Arab African Pharma (APP)”.

EPSF Main committees
EPSF has 4 projects oriented committees which aim to serve pharmacy students, pharmacists and the community.

1-Public Health
Public health  committee is an important part of the Egyptian Pharmaceutical Students' Federation,
Using their strength in scientific and public health research, they have built effective teams around Egypt, they are organizing health awareness campaigns in universities, public places, villages and Schools about different epidemic places in Egypt to increase public awareness.

EPSF is intended to be one of  the best organizations all over Egypt  which is interested in Public health, all the Associations collaborate with their time and efforts preparing the materials and actively arrange campaigns all over Egypt; they all interact and develop their skills, to increase people's awareness, help them to change their life style and present a real change on ground.

Public Health committee Responsible for:
Promote public awareness in Egypt and to deliver the concept of pharmacy students' role to the public and Spreading the latest information about Public Health topics to EPSF member association.
holding awareness campaigns for the WHO Health awareness day Public Health workshops during Annual Congress, National Symposium and through the year.

Tobacco Alert Campaign
Each year EPSF exerts effort to reduce the prevalence of smoking-related diseases. Their target is to convince people to stop and to help them understand the risks of developing the fatal diseases caused by smoking. Congresses and campaigns aim to help people detect the diseases caused by smoking and be diagnosed early.

2-Professional Development
Professional Development committee Responsible for:

Creating events for developing the pharmacy practice and Promoting the pharmacist role in the community and improving the quality of the profession through professional events and workshops .
Establishment of basic projects included by this portfolio such as Clinical Skills Event, Patient Counseling Event, Pharmacy Profession Awareness Campaign and Teddy Bear Hospital according to the need of EPSF through the year .

3-Continuous Education
Continuous Education committee responsible for

-Plan, coordinate and innovate courses.

-creating other educational programs which helps pharmacy students in Egypt to fulfill the profession requirements after graduation .

-Plan and coordinate the Mini diploma program and responsible for its development to achieve the target and to appear in the best way .

-Work for creating other educational and research programs.

Later in the 20th national symposium 2021, the GA's decision was to merge the PD and CE committees together to form a new committee with the name PE (Pharmaceutical Education).

4-Student Exchange Program (SEP)

Student Exchange Program (SEP) is a project offering professional pharmacy internships. Every year, through it pharmacy students around Egypt are given the opportunity to experience the field of pharmacy in other countries. The program runs throughout the year (Winter version and Summer version), but the majority of the exchanges take place between May and September.

The length is usually 1 to 3 months with a minimum of 60 working hours per exchange, and possible host sites include
Community pharmacy;
Hospital pharmacy;
Clinical pharmacy;
Wholesale pharmacy;
Pharmaceutical industry;
Research at university;
Government or private health agencies.
The host may also provide room, board, and/or pocket money in addition to the training site in order to help the applicant.

References

  Middle East Youth Network | الاتحاد المصري لطلاب الصيدلة يفوز بجائزة الاتحاد الدولي في تايلاند
  "Egyptian Federation for pharmacy students win first place globally as the best student organization."
  بدء فعاليات المؤتمر الـ 16 للاتحاد المصري لطلاب الصيدلة بالإسكندرية غدًا - بوابة الأهرام

External links
 Egyptian Pharmaceutical Students' Federation (EPSF)
 International Pharmaceutical Students' Federation (IPSF)
 IPSF Eastern Mediterranean Regional Office (IPSF EMRO)
 Egyptian Pharmacists' Syndicate

Medical and health organisations based in Egypt
Medical and health student organizations
Organizations established in 1982
Student exchange
Student organisations in Egypt
1982 establishments in Egypt